The 2019 CBA Playoffs was the postseason tournament of the Chinese Basketball Association's 2018–19 season. It began on 16 March 2019. In this season, the playoffs was expanded from 10 teams to 12 teams.

Bracket

First round
All times are in China standard time (UTC+8)

(5) Beijing Ducks vs. (12) Shanghai Sharks

(6) Zhejiang Lions vs. (11) Zhejiang Golden Bulls

(7) Fujian Sturgeons vs. (10) Jilin Northeast Tigers

(8) Shandong Golden Stars vs. (9) Jiangsu Dragons

Quarterfinals

(1) Guangdong Southern Tigers vs. (9) Jiangsu Dragons

(2) Liaoning Flying Leopards vs. (7) Fujian Sturgeons

(3) Xinjiang Flying Tigers vs. (6) Zhejiang Lions

(4) Shenzhen Leopards vs. (5) Beijing Ducks

Semifinals

(1) Guangdong Southern Tigers vs. (4) Shenzhen Leopards

(2) Liaoning Flying Leopards vs. (3) Xinjiang Flying Tigers

Finals

(1) Guangdong Southern Tigers vs. (3) Xinjiang Flying Tigers

References

Chinese Basketball Association playoffs
playoffs